Serine/threonine-protein phosphatase with EF-hands 1 is an enzyme that in humans is encoded by the PPEF1 gene.

Function 

This gene encodes a member of the serine/threonine protein phosphatase with EF-hand motif family. The protein contains a protein phosphatase catalytic domain, and at least two EF-hand calcium-binding motifs in its C terminus. Although its substrate(s) is unknown, the encoded protein has been suggested to play a role in specific sensory neuron function and/or development. This gene shares high sequence similarity with the Drosophila retinal degeneration C (rdgC) gene. Several alternatively spliced transcript variants, each encoding a distinct isoform, have been described.

Interactions 

PPEF1 has been shown to interact with Calmodulin 1.

References

Further reading 

 
 
 
 
 
 
 

EF-hand-containing proteins